Sarcosagium is a genus of fungi in the family Thelocarpaceae. It contains two species: Sarcosagium biatorellum and Sarcosagium campestre.

References

External links
Index Fungorum

Ascomycota genera
Lichen genera
Taxa described in 1856
Taxa named by Abramo Bartolommeo Massalongo